The gens Herminia was an ancient patrician house at Rome.  Members of the gens appear during the first war between the Roman Republic and the Etruscans, circa 508 BC, and from then to 448 BC.  Two members of the family held the consulship, Titus Herminius Aquilinus in 506 BC, and Lars Herminius Aquilinus in 448.

Origin
The Roman antiquaries regarded the Herminii as an Etruscan family.  Silius Italicus mentions an Etruscan fisherman by this name.  The Herminii are one of the only Roman families known to have used distinctly Etruscan praenomina.  However, in the traditions relating to the stand of Horatius and his companions at the Sublician Bridge, Titus Herminius appears to represent the ancient tribe of the Titienses, the Sabine element of the Roman populus.  A number of Sabine and Oscan names begin with the syllable, Her-.

Praenomina
The praenomina associated with the Herminii are Titus and Lars, although in place of Lars, some sources give Spurius or Lucius.

Branches and cognomina
The only Heminii appearing in the consular fasti bore the cognomen Aquilinus, apparently derived from aquila, an eagle.

Members

 Titus Herminius Aquilinus, consul in 506 BC; fell in the Battle of Lake Regillus, circa 498.
 Lars Herminius T. f. Aquilinus, consul in 448 BC.

See also
 List of Roman gentes

Footnotes

 
Roman gentes